Robert or Bob Woodward may refer to:

Bob Woodward (Robert Upshur Woodward, born 1943), American investigative reporter and author
Bob Woodward (actor) (1907–1972), American actor
Robert Burns Woodward (1917–1979), American organic chemist
Robert F. Woodward (1908–2001), U.S. diplomat
Robert Simpson Woodward (1849–1924), American physicist and mathematician
Robert Woodward (architect) (1923–2010), Australian architect and fountain designer
Rob Woodward (born 1962), pitcher in Major League Baseball
 Robert Woodward (musician), member of Lieutenant Pigeon
Rob Woodward (politician), state senator in the U.S. state of Colorado